Tim Kirby is an American-expatriate radio host in Moscow, Russia. In 2006, Kirby migrated from the United States to Russia. He is best known for the program Alien on the radio station "Mayak" (Радио Маяк).

Biography

Kirby was born on October 19, 1981, in Cleveland, Ohio.

In 2003, he graduated from the Pittsburgh Institute of Arts, Faculty of Graphic Design with a bachelor's degree.

Since 2012, on the educational Internet portal "Cognitive TV", Kirby hosts videos where he talks about life in the United States and the political situation in America.

Since 2017, he hosted We decide together and Double agent at Tsargrad TV.

On November 29, 2018, Kirby received Russian citizenship.

Personal life
Kirby is married to Inge Morozova, a native of Kirov. They have two children.

See also
 Michael Bohm
 Jeff Monson

Notes

External links
 "How Russians changed my life: Tim from the U.S.", Russia Beyond

1981 births
Living people
American expatriates in Russia
Russian male journalists
Russian radio personalities
American emigrants to Russia
Naturalised citizens of Russia
Russian people of American descent